Haigh railway station served the village of Haigh, West Yorkshire, England from 1850 to 1965 on the Hallam Line.

History 
The station opened on 1 January 1850 by the Lancashire and Yorkshire Railway. It closed to both passengers and goods traffic on 13 September 1965.

References

External links 

Disused railway stations in Wakefield
Former Lancashire and Yorkshire Railway stations
Railway stations in Great Britain opened in 1850
Railway stations in Great Britain closed in 1965
1850 establishments in England
1965 disestablishments in England
Beeching closures in England